The 2010 AFC Futsal Championship qualification was held in late 2009 and early 2010 to determine 12 spots to the final tournament in Uzbekistan. The teams finishing first, second and third in the 2008 AFC Futsal Championship, and the host nation for the 2010 competition, receive automatic byes to Finals.

System 
Twenty-six teams registered in qualifying action for 12 places in the finals but Saudi Arabia and Brunei later withdrew, The teams have been divided into two qualifying groups in each zone. The top two teams from each group qualified for the crossover semifinals in their respective zones with only the top three going through to the Finals. 

Reigning champions Iran, runners-up Thailand, Japan and 2010 edition hosts Uzbekistan have direct entry into the tournament proper. but Japan took part in the qualifiers because the East Asian Football Federation (EAFF) has designated the event as their official regional tournament.

Qualified teams

Zones

ASEAN

Group stage

Group A

Group B

Knockout stage

Semi-finals

Third place play-off

Final

East

Group stage

Group A

Group B

Classification

Knockout stage

Semi-finals

Third place play-off

Final

South & Central

West

Group stage

Group A

Group B

Knockout stage

Semi-finals

Third place play-off

Final

References

 Qualifying Results

AFC Futsal Championship qualification
2009 in Asian futsal
International futsal competitions hosted by Indonesia
International futsal competitions hosted by China
International futsal competitions hosted by Vietnam
International futsal competitions hosted by Qatar
2010 in Asian futsal